The Anthesteria was one of the four Athenian festivals in honor of Dionysus. It was held each year from the 11th to the 13th of the month of Anthesterion, around the time of the January or February full moon. The three days of the feast were called Pithoigia, Choës, and Chytroi.

It celebrated the beginning of spring, particularly the maturing of the wine stored at the previous vintage, whose pithoi were now ceremoniously opened. During the feast, social order was interrupted or inverted, the slaves being allowed to participate, uniting the household in ancient fashion. The Anthesteria also had aspects of a festival of the dead: either the Keres or the Carians were entertained, freely roaming the city until they were expelled after the festival. A Greek proverb, employed of those who pestered for continued favors, ran "Out of doors, Keres! It is no longer Anthesteria".

Name
This is cognate with Sanskrit  ('soma plant') and may have referred to the 'bloom' of the grape vine. The Cambridge ritualist A. W. Verrall, however, glossed the name as a Feast of Revocation (to "pray up") in reference to the aspects of the festival where the dead were considered to walk among the living. Harrison also regarded the Anthesteria as primarily concerned with placating ancestral spirits.

Origins
Athenians of the Classical age were aware that the festival was of great antiquity. Its ritual marriage of a queen to Dionysus recalls myths concerning Theseus and Ariadne, but this is no longer considered a dependable sign that the festival had been celebrated in the Minoan period. Since the festival was celebrated by Athens and all the Ionian cities, however, it is assumed that it must have preceded the Ionian migration of the late eleventh or early tenth century BC. This still makes it the oldest datable part of the Eleusinian Mysteries.

Days

Pithoigia
The first day was Pithoigia ( 'The Jar-Opening'). The jars of wine from the previous year were opened, libations offered to Dionysus, and the entire household (including the slaves) joining in the festivities. Spring flowers were used to decorate the rooms of the house, the home's drinking vessels, and any children over three years of age.

On them, the souls of the dead came up from the underworld and walked abroad. People chewed leaves of hawthorn or buckthorn and besmeared their doors with tar to protect themselves from evil. Nonetheless, the festive character of the ceremonies predominated.

Choes
The second day was Choës ( 'The Pouring'). Merrymaking continued: people dressed themselves gaily, some in the figures of Dionysus's entourage, and paid a round of visits to their acquaintances. Drinking clubs held contests to see who could drain their cups the most rapidly. Others poured libations on the tombs of deceased relatives. The day also marked a state occasion: a peculiarly solemn and secret ceremony in the sanctuary of Dionysus 'in the marshes', which was closed throughout the rest of the year. Despite the name, there were no actual marshes in the immediate surroundings of Athens and the sanctuary was located in the Bouleuterion in the Athenian Agora. Athens' ritual queen, the basilinna, underwent a ceremony of marriage to the god. Precisely what this entailed, and how physical was the public union, remain matters of discussion, but it may have involved intercourse. She was assisted by the gerarai, 14 Athenian matrons chosen by her husband the archon basileus, who were sworn to secrecy. Burkert regarded the ceremony as a recreation of the yielding of Ariadne to Dionysus by Theseus during their escape from Minoan Crete.

Chytroi
The third day was Chytroi ( 'The Pots'), a festival of the dead. Fruit or cooked pulse was offered to Hermes in his capacity as Hermes Chthonios, an underworld figure, and to the souls of the dead, who were then bidden to depart. None of the Olympians were included and no one tasted the pottage, which was food of the dead. Celebration continued and games were held. Although no performances were allowed at the theater, a sort of rehearsal took place, at which the players for the ensuing dramatic festival were selected.

Modern celebration and revival 
Practitioners of the reconstructed religion of Ancient Greece, known as Hellenic Polytheists, seek to restore ancient festivals such as Anthesteria. Reconstructionists take from primary and secondary sources to reconstruct the festival. Drinking watered down wine, having potlucks, and reciting hymns to Dionysus are some ways Hellenic polytheists celebrate. Other ways include making garlands, celebrating the coming of spring, and reconstructing other aspects of the festival.  

Honouring the dead is also reconstructed. Some make the dead a meal: panspermia is the best option, but eggs, leeks and garlic also work well. 

Worshipping Dionysus is a large aspect of modern celebration. The previous celebration methods can be dedicated to him, and flowers and garlands may be offered to the god. Hymns such as the Homeric and Orphic Hymns may be sung. Generally, Hellenic Polytheists will try to reconstruct most aspects of the festival or reinterpret them.

See also
 Athenian festivals
 Attic Calendar 
 Dionysia and Bacchanalia
 Ganachakra
 Lenaia
 Rosalia and Feast of the Lemures
 All Souls' Night, Day of the Dead, and carnival

Notes

Citations

References
 
 
 
 
 
 . 
 

Attribution:
  Endnotes:

Further reading

External links
The Anthesteria Bibliotheca Arcana (1997)

Festivals in ancient Athens
Greek festivals of Dionysus
January observances
February observances